Zeeshan Hussain Siddiqi (born 26 October 1976) is a Canadian international cricketer. Born in Karachi, he made his first-class debut in 1995 for Pakistan National Shipping Corporation. He later played for both Karachi Blues and Karachi Whites. In 2011, he made his international debut for Canada.

References

External links
 

1976 births
Canada One Day International cricketers
Canadian cricketers
Zeeshan
Zeeshan
Zeeshan
Living people
Muhajir people
Zeeshan
Zeeshan
Zeeshan
Zeeshan